Zhang Chuanmiao (February 1937 – 11 September 2022) was a Chinese politician. A member of the Communist Party, he served on the National People's Congress from 1993 to 1998.

Chuanmiao died in Shenyang on 11 September 2022, at the age of 85.

References

1937 births
2022 deaths
Chinese Communist Party politicians from Shandong
Delegates to the 8th National People's Congress